Alexander Fraser Campbell, GC (2 May 1898 – 18 October 1940), known as Sandy Campbell, was a British Army officer of the Royal Engineers who was posthumously awarded the George Cross for conspicuous gallantry in defusing a bomb in October 1940.

Triumph Engineering Works unexploded bomb
On 14 October 1940 at Chapel Street, Coventry, Second Lieutenant Campbell along with Sergeant Michael Gibson and Sappers W. Gibson, R. Gilchrest, A. Plumb, R.W. Skelton and Driver E.F.G. Taylor were tasked to deal with a  unexploded bomb.
 
The sappers spent almost four days uncovering the bomb which was found to contain a very damaged delayed-action fuse mechanism which could not be removed in situ. Though any electrical charge within the fuse was thought to have dissipated, Campbell still applied a discharge tool.
 
On 17 October 1940, Campbell, believing the bomb to be inert ordered it to be moved. It was loaded onto a lorry and taken to Whitley Common where it could be detonated safely. Campbell positioned himself next to the bomb on this journey listening for any timer mechanism that might have been activated by the bomb's removal. The bomb was remotely detonated.

Death
On 18 October 1940, Campbell and his squad were attempting to complete an identical procedure on another bomb. However, after arriving at Whitley Common, the bomb exploded during unloading, killing the entire bomb squad.

Following a funeral service at Coventry Cathedral on 25 October 1940, the squad were buried in a collective grave in Coventry's London Road Cemetery. The squad comprised 2nd Lt. Alexander Fraser Campbell, Sergeant Michael Gibson, Sappers William Gibson, Richard Gilchrest, Jack Plumb, Ronald William Skelton and Driver E. F. Taylor.

George Cross citation
Campbell's posthumous George Cross citation appeared in The London Gazette on 22 January 1941:

His George Cross is on display in the Royal Engineers Museum.

Memorial
On 18 October 2006, the anniversary of the death of Campbell and his fellow soldiers, a memorial plaque was dedicated to their memory close to where they died on Whitley Common.

The memorial reads:

References

Further reading
 

British recipients of the George Cross
Royal Engineers officers
Deaths by airstrike during World War II
British Army personnel killed in World War II
1898 births
1940 deaths
Bomb disposal personnel
Scottish military personnel
British Army personnel of World War I
Dalmellington